Lewis Henry (June 8, 1885 – July 23, 1941) was a Republican member of the United States House of Representatives from New York.

Henry was born in Elmira, New York. He graduated from Cornell University in 1909, where he was a member of The Kappa Alpha Society and president of the Quill and Dagger society. He received a law degree from Columbia University in 1911. He was supervisor of Elmira's first ward from 1914 until 1920. He was elected to Congress in 1922 to fill the vacancy caused by the resignation of Alanson B. Houghton and served from April 11, 1922, until March 4, 1923. He died in Boston, Massachusetts.

Sources

1885 births
1941 deaths
Cornell University alumni
Republican Party members of the United States House of Representatives from New York (state)
Columbia Law School alumni
20th-century American politicians